The Returnees is a novel written by Elizabeth Okoh. It was first publish in 2020 by Hodder & Stoughton an imprint of Hachette UK.

References 

2020 British novels
2020 Nigerian novels
Hodder & Stoughton books